Convention District is a light rail station in Houston, Texas on the METRORail system. It is served by the Green and Purple lines and is located on Capitol and Rusk streets near the Avenida De La Americas. The station is named for the nearby George R. Brown Convention Center; it is also adjacent to Minute Maid Park, the home venue of the MLB team the Houston Astros. 

Convention District station opened on May 23, 2015.

References

METRORail stations
Railway stations in the United States opened in 2015
2015 establishments in Texas
Railway stations in Harris County, Texas